Johnny Pye and the Fool-Killer was an Off-Broadway musical with music by Randy Courts, the book by Mark St. Germain, and lyrics by Randy Courts and Mark St. Germain based on the story of the same name by Stephen Vincent Benét. It was originally performed at Seattle's La Pensee Discovery! Theatre in 1993 and ran at Lamb's Theatre from October 21, 1993 and closed on December 12, 1993 after 54 performances.

Synopsis
The story follows an all-American boy Johnny Pye in 1928, and following the passing of his father, he has advanced awareness of death. The bereaving youngster actually sees the figure of death: It is a deformed, portly workman wearing a smock and cap and toting a grindstone. It shows Johnny his aspirations: he wants to be a doctor, then a painter, then a minister, but ends up being the postmaster in his hometown of Martinsville, United States of America.

Over the course of the show, Death (The Fool-Killer) can only be seen by Johnny. When they first meet, Johnny angrily challenges him. Johnny later leaves to serve in World War II, and when he returns after nearly dying, he steals the girl of his dreams from his arch enemy Wilbur. Through the several decades the show passes through (it ends in 1995), Johnny sees many of his loved ones get taken away. Johnny makes a deal with Death in the early process of their relationship: if Johnny can solve a riddle that the Fool-Killer presents, then Johnny's life will be spared. The second act deals with the happy marriage of Johnny and Suzy, and eventually to when they are great-grandparents and Johnny can't remember any of their names.

Original Cast
It was directed by Drew Scott Harris, musical staging by Janet Watson, set by Peter Harrison, costumes by Claudia Stephens, lighting by Kenneth Posner, sound by David Lawson, musical direction by Steven M. Alper, orchestrations by Douglas Besterman, and production stage manager was David Waggett.

It starred Daniel Jenkins as Johnny Pye, Spiro Malas as Foolkiller, Kaitlin Hopkins as Suzy Marsh, Peter Gerety as Wilbur Wilberforce, Tanny McDonald as Mrs. Miller, Ralston Hill as Barber, Mark Lotito as Bob, Michael Ingram as Bill, Conor Gillespie as Young Johnny Pie, and Heather Lee Soroka as Young Suzy Marsh.

Song list
Another Day
Goodbye Johnny
Shower of Sparks
Occupations
Handle With Care
The End of the Road
Challenge To Love
The Barbershop
Married With Children
The Land Where There Is No Death
Time Passes
Never Felt Better In My Life
Epilogue (The Answer)
Finale

References
The Guide to Musical Theater: Johnny Pye and the Fool-Killer
New York Times review

Off-Broadway musicals
1993 musicals
Musicals based on short fiction